Francesco Vivacqua (born 19 June 1994) is an Italian football player. He plays for Serie D club Molfetta.

Club career
In the 2015–16 season, he helped his Latvian club Spartaks Jūrmala advance to the second qualifying round of the Europa League, and scored a late equalizer in the return leg of the second round game against Vojvodina, but his team was eliminated 1–4 on aggregate.

He made his Serie C debut for Rende on 26 August 2017 in a game against Reggina.

On 8 October 2020 he moved to Cavese.

On 19 August 2021, he signed with Picerno.

References

External links
 

1994 births
Sportspeople from Cosenza
Footballers from Calabria
Living people
Italian footballers
Association football forwards
Taranto F.C. 1927 players
FK Spartaks Jūrmala players
Rende Calcio 1968 players
Cavese 1919 players
AZ Picerno players
Serie C players
Serie D players
Latvian Higher League players
Italian expatriate footballers
Expatriate footballers in Latvia
Italian expatriate sportspeople in Latvia